The Beijing X6 is a mid-size CUV produced by BAIC under the Beijing brand.

Overview

It was presented in November 2021 at the Guangzhou Auto Show.

Powertrain

References

BAIC Group vehicles
Sport utility vehicles
Cars of China